Anisephyra is a genus of moths in the family Geometridae.  It was previously considered a synonym of Palaeaspilates.

Species
Anisephyra ocularia (Fabricius, 1775)
Anisephyra rufaria Warren, 1896

References

Cosymbiini
Geometridae genera